Sri Shahu Mandir Mahavidyalaya, also known as Shahu College, is an undergraduate and postgraduate coeducational college situated near Parvati Ramana, Pune, Maharashtra. It was established in the year 1960. The college is affiliated with Pune University and offers different courses in arts and commerce.

Departments

Arts and Commerce

Marathi
English
Economics
Psychology
Geography
Commerce

Accreditation
The college is recognized by the University Grants Commission (UGC).

References

External links

Universities and colleges in Pune
Educational institutions established in 1960
1960 establishments in Maharashtra